Lala Hansraj Gupta was an Indian educationist, social worker and philanthropist. He was awarded Padma Vibhushan by Government of India for his services to society.

He served as seventh Mayor of Delhi. Gupta was a founding member of the Child Education Society in 1944. Bal Bharati Public School is one of the private institutions owned by the Child Education Society.

He died on 3 July 1985.

References

External links
 Bal Bharati Public School, Child Education Society

1975 deaths
People from Delhi
Recipients of the Padma Bhushan in public affairs
20th-century Indian educational theorists
Indian philanthropists
Mayors of Delhi
Year of birth missing
Delhi politicians

Not very descriptive